John Huband, MP for Worcestershire

John Huband may also refer to:

Sir John Huband, 1st Baronet (1649–1710) of the Huband baronets
Sir John Huband, 2nd Baronet (died 1717) of the Huband baronets
Sir John Huband, 3rd Baronet (1713–1730) of the Huband baronets